The Alexandra was an all-wooden bodied electric brougham made by the Phoenix Carriage Co of Birmingham from 1905 to 1906. It included a safety device found in hansom cabs to stop passengers from falling out of the vehicle in the event of a sudden halt. A petrol-engine vehicle, also listed for sale, but it is unknown how much, if any, success this model found.

See also
 List of car manufacturers of the United Kingdom

References
Georgano, G.N., "Alexandra", in G.N. Georgano, ed., The Complete Encyclopedia of Motorcars 1885-1968  (New York: E.P. Dutton and Co., 1974), pp.33.

Defunct motor vehicle manufacturers of England
Electric vehicles introduced in the 20th century
Defunct companies based in Birmingham, West Midlands

Cars introduced in 1905